The 2011 Aragonese regional election was held on Sunday, 22 May 2011, to elect the 8th Cortes of the autonomous community of Aragon. All 67 seats in the Cortes were up for election. The election was held simultaneously with regional elections in 12 other autonomous communities and local elections all throughout Spain.

The outgoing Spanish Socialist Workers' Party (PSOE) administration suffered a serious defeat after losing nearly 30% of its 2007 vote. The opposition People's Party (PP) obtained the best result of its history in the region, despite remaining 4 seats short for an absolute majority of seats. This was also the first time since the 1999 election that the PP had received the most votes in Aragon. United Left (IU) had its best result since 1995, gaining 3 seats for a total of 4. The Aragonese Party (PAR), on the other hand, obtained its worst historical result, while the Aragonese Union (CHA) remained static at its 2007 result.

As a result of the election, Luisa Fernanda Rudi from the People's Party was elected President of Aragon as part of a PP-PAR coalition agreement. The PAR had been previously the PSOE coalition partner from 1999 to 2011.

Overview

Electoral system
The Cortes of Aragon were the devolved, unicameral legislature of the autonomous community of Aragon, having legislative power in regional matters as defined by the Spanish Constitution and the Aragonese Statute of Autonomy, as well as the ability to vote confidence in or withdraw it from a regional president.

Voting for the Cortes was on the basis of universal suffrage, which comprised all nationals over 18 years of age, registered in Aragon and in full enjoyment of their political rights. Amendments to the electoral law in 2011 required for Aragonese people abroad to apply for voting before being permitted to vote, a system known as "begged" or expat vote. The 67 members of the Cortes of Aragon were elected using the D'Hondt method and a closed list proportional representation, with an electoral threshold of three percent of valid votes—which included blank ballots—being applied in each constituency. Seats were allocated to constituencies, corresponding to the provinces of Huesca, Teruel and Zaragoza, with each being allocated an initial minimum of 13 seats and the remaining 28 being distributed in proportion to their populations (provided that the seat-to-population ratio in the most populated province did not exceed 2.75 times that of the least populated one).

The use of the D'Hondt method might result in a higher effective threshold, depending on the district magnitude.

Election date
The term of the Cortes of Aragon expired four years after the date of their previous election, unless they were dissolved earlier. The election decree was required to be issued no later than the twenty-fifth day prior to the date of expiry of parliament and published on the following day in the Official Gazette of Aragon (BOA), with election day taking place on the fifty-fourth day from publication. The previous election was held on 27 May 2007, which meant that the legislature's term would have expired on 27 May 2011. The election decree was required to be published in the BOA no later than 3 May 2011, with the election taking place on the fifty-fourth day from publication, setting the latest possible election date for the Cortes on Sunday, 26 June 2011.

The president had the prerogative to dissolve the Cortes of Aragon and call a snap election, provided that no motion of no confidence was in process and that dissolution did not occur before one year had elapsed since the previous one. In the event of an investiture process failing to elect a regional president within a two-month period from the first ballot, the Cortes were to be automatically dissolved and a fresh election called.

Parties and candidates
The electoral law allowed for parties and federations registered in the interior ministry, coalitions and groupings of electors to present lists of candidates. Parties and federations intending to form a coalition ahead of an election were required to inform the relevant Electoral Commission within ten days of the election call, whereas groupings of electors needed to secure the signature of at least one percent of the electorate in the constituencies for which they sought election, disallowing electors from signing for more than one list of candidates.

Below is a list of the main parties and electoral alliances which contested the election:

Opinion polls
The table below lists voting intention estimates in reverse chronological order, showing the most recent first and using the dates when the survey fieldwork was done, as opposed to the date of publication. Where the fieldwork dates are unknown, the date of publication is given instead. The highest percentage figure in each polling survey is displayed with its background shaded in the leading party's colour. If a tie ensues, this is applied to the figures with the highest percentages. The "Lead" column on the right shows the percentage-point difference between the parties with the highest percentages in a poll. When available, seat projections determined by the polling organisations are displayed below (or in place of) the percentages in a smaller font; 34 seats were required for an absolute majority in the Cortes of Aragon.

Results

Overall

Distribution by constituency

Aftermath

References
Opinion poll sources

Other

2011 in Aragon
Aragon
Regional elections in Aragon
May 2011 events in Europe